Finland is a sovereign state in Northern Europe. It was a relative latecomer to industrialization, remaining a largely agrarian country until the 1950s. It rapidly developed an advanced economy while building an extensive Nordic-style welfare state, resulting in widespread prosperity and one of the highest per capita incomes in the world. However,   Finnish GDP growth was negative in 2012–2014 (−0.698% to −1.426%), with a preceding nadir of −8% in 2009. Finland is a top performer in numerous metrics of national performance, including education, economic competitiveness, civil liberties, quality of life, and human development.

For further information on the types of business entities in this country and their abbreviations, see "Business entities in Finland".

Notable firms 
This list includes notable companies with primary headquarters located in the country. The industry and sector follow the Industry Classification Benchmark taxonomy. Organizations which have ceased operations are included and noted as defunct.

See also 
List of largest companies in Finland
List of banks in Finland

External links 
 Official register of companies and entities

References 

Finland